is a public urban park situated at 1 chōme Tenjimbashi in  Kita-ku, Osaka, Japan. It lies on the north side of the Ōkawa (Kyū-Yodo River) between Temma-bashi bridge and Tenjim-bashi bridge.

The park was constructed at the former Temma-Aomono-Ichiba vegetable wholesale market. Now, this park is a popular place for cherry blossom viewing in spring along the Kyū-Yodo River. The cherry blossom promenade is also a cycle path, which continues to northern Osaka (Suita City).

Facilities
Minami-Temma tennis court
Three grass (hard) courts
Tenjimbashi Kita Kōban (police substation)
Monuments
Monument of Temma old songs
Monument of Edo era, Yodo River 50 Koku boat songs
Monument of vegetable wholesale market

Activities in the park
cherry blossom viewing : April

Access
Temmabashi Station of Keihan Railway is nearest.

Photographs

See also
Nakanoshima Park: west of this park
Sakuranomiya Park: east of this park
Osaka Castle Park

References

External links

Official page of large park in Kita-ward, Osaka City

Parks and gardens in Osaka